Joy is a common unisex given name meaning joy, happiness, joyful. A common variant of the name is the female given name Joyce (name).

People with the given name Joy
Joy (singer) (born 1996), South Korean singer and member of Red Velvet (group)
Joy Adamson (1910–1980), wildlife rehabilitator and author 
Joy Banerjee (born 1963), Bengali cinema actor
Joy Behar (born 1942), American comedian and actress
Joy Bokiri (born 1998), Nigerian women's footballer
Joy Bryant (born 1974), American actress
Joy Browne (born 1944), American radio psychologist
Joy Burke (born 1990), Taiwanese-American women's basketball player
Joy Carroll Vicar who inspired The Vicar of Dibley 
Joy Crookes (born 1998), British singer-songwriter
Joy Davidman (1915–1960), American writer and wife of C. S. Lewis 
Joy Destiny Tobing (born 1980), Indonesian gospel singer 
Joy Enriquez (born 1978), American singer and actress 
Joy Fawcett (born 1968), American soccer player 
Joy Fleming (1944–2017), German singer 
Defne Joy Foster (1975–2011), Turkish actress, presenter, VJ
Joy Garnett (born 1965) Canadian-American artist
Joy Giovanni (born 1978), American actress, model, wrestler, and WWE Diva
Joy Grieveson (born 1941), British track and field athlete 
Joy Paul Guilford (1897-1987), American psychologist
Joy Harjo (born 1951), American poet
Joy Kere diplomat from the Solomon Islands
Joy Kogawa (born 1935), Canadian poet and novelist 
Joy Lauren (born 1989), American actress 
Joy Lofthouse (1923–2017), British WW2 pilot
Joy Mangano (born 1956), American inventor, and businesswoman
Joy Marshall (1867–1903), New Zealand clergyman, teacher, tennis player, cricketer, and rugby footballer
Joy Morris (born 1970), Canadian mathematician
Joy Morton (1855–1934), American businessman and conservationist
Joy Mukherjee (1939–2012), Indian film actor and director
Joy Ogwu (born 1946), Nigerian diplomat 
Joy Oladokun, American singer-songwriter 
Joy Padgett (born 1947), American politician
Joy Powell (born 1962),American activist 
Joy Quigley (born 1948), New Zealand politician
Joy Reid (born 1968), American cable television host with the full name Joy-Ann M. Lomena-Reid
Joy San Buenaventura (born 1959), Filipino-born American politician
Joy Sarkar, Bengali music director 
Joy A. Thomas (1963-2020), American Indian-born informational theorist and scientist
Joy Smith (born 1947), Canadian politician 
Joy Williams (singer) (born 1982), American pop singer 
Joy Williams (Australian writer) (1942–2006), Australian poet 
Joy Williams (American writer) (born 1944), American author
Joy Wolfram (born 1989), Finnish nanoscientist.
Joy Cherian (born 1944), Commissioner at the United States Equal Employment Opportunity Commission
Joy Sengupta (born 1968), Indian film and stage actor
Joy Alukkas (born 1956), Indian businessman from Kerala

Fictional characters
 Joy, one of Riley Andersen's emotions and the main protagonist of Disney Pixar's Inside Out.
 Nurse Joy, a nurse from the Pokémon TV series.
 Joy Wang, the daughter in Everything Everywhere All at Once (2022 film). Played by Stephanie Hsu.

See also
 Gioia (disambiguation), the Italian version of the name
 Joie, the French version of the name

English feminine given names
Feminine given names
Virtue names